Ostend is a major coastal city in Belgium.

Ostend may also refer to:

Places
Arrondissement of Ostend, West Flanders, Belgium
Ostend, Essex, England
Ostend, Norfolk, England
Ostend (Frankfurt am Main), a city district of Frankfurt am Main, Germany
Ostend, New Zealand

Other uses
Ostend (Chamber of Representatives constituency), a constituency of the Belgian Chamber of Representatives from 1831 to 1900
Ostend Company (1722–1731), a chartered trading company in the Austrian Netherlands (modern-day Belgium)
Ostend Manifesto
9471 Ostend, a minor planet

See also
 
 Oostende (disambiguation)
 Ostende (disambiguation)
 Oosteinde, a village in North Holland